Fanas is a Swiss village in the Prättigau and a former municipality in the political district of Prättigau/Davos in the canton of Graubünden. On 1 January 2011 Fanas and Valzeina were merged with the municipality of Grüsch.

History

Fanas is first mentioned in second half of the 12th Century as Phanaunes.

Geography
Of this area, 45% is used for agricultural purposes, while 36.8% is forested. Of the rest of the land, 0.7% is settled (buildings or roads) and the remainder (17.5%) is non-productive (rivers, glaciers or mountains).

The municipality is located in the Seewis sub-district of the Prättigau/Davos district on a terrace between Grüsch and Schiers. It consists of the linear village of Fanas.

Demographics
Fanas has a population (as of 31 December 2010) of 401. , 3.1% of the population was made up of foreign nationals. Over the last 10 years the population has grown at a rate of 3.7%.

, the gender distribution of the population was 47.3% male and 52.7% female. The age distribution, in Fanas is; 47 children or 12.5% of the population are between 0 and 9 years old and 42 teenagers or 11.1% are between 10 and 19. Of the adult population, 39 people or 10.3% of the population are between 20 and 29 years old. 48 people or 12.7% are between 30 and 39, 62 people or 16.4% are between 40 and 49, and 55 people or 14.6% are between 50 and 59. The senior population distribution is 38 people or 10.1% of the population are between 60 and 69 years old, 32 people or 8.5% are between 70 and 79, there are 13 people or 3.4% who are between 80 and 89 there is 1 person who is between 90 and 99.

In the 2007 federal election the most popular party was the SVP which received 42.9% of the vote. The next three most popular parties were the FDP (26.4%), the SP (19.9%) and the CVP (6.2%).

The entire Swiss population is generally well educated. In Fanas about 75.6% of the population (between age 25-64) have completed either non-mandatory upper secondary education or additional higher education (either University or a Fachhochschule).

Fanas has an unemployment rate of 0.94%. , there were 34 people employed in the primary economic sector and about 12 businesses involved in this sector. 26 people are employed in the secondary sector and there are 7 businesses in this sector. 28 people are employed in the tertiary sector, with 13 businesses in this sector.

The historical population is given in the following table:

Languages
Most of the population speaks German (98.1%), with French being second most common ( 0.8%) and Swedish being third ( 0.5%). Originally the village spoke Romansh, but by the mid 16th Century the majority spoke German.

References

External links
 Official Web site 

Grüsch
Former municipalities of Graubünden